Diamond Dogs is a 2007 Canadian-Chinese (American) action film directed by Samuel Dolhasca and uncredited co-directed by Dolph Lundgren, who also starred in the film. The film was released on direct-to-DVD in the United States on April 29, 2008.

Plot
The story of Diamond Dogs concerns a group of American fortune hunters who hire a mercenary called Xander Ronson (Lundgren) to act as their guide and bodyguard, while they search for a priceless Buddhist artifact deep within the Chinese wilderness. They get more than they bargained for, however, as they come face to face with Russian mercenaries also after the artifact.

Cast
Dolph Lundgren – Xander Ronson
Yu Nan – Anika
Xue Zuren – Ang Shaw
William Shriver – Chambers
Raicho Vasilev – Zhukov
Zhang Chunnian – Eye Patch

Production
The film was set mostly in Inner Mongolia, from 19 September 2006 and 2 November 2006. The production faced difficult and unanticipated circumstances. Dolph Lundgren stepped up to direct the picture instead of co-producer Shimon Dotan after just a few days into filming.

Release
The film came out as a direct to DVD release. The DVD release dates are as follows: 
 Germany – 31 August 2007
 China – 14 December 2007
 Brazil – 17 January 2008
 USA – 29 April 2008

External links
 
 

2007 films
2007 action films
American action films
2000s English-language films
Films directed by Dolph Lundgren
Films shot in China
2007 martial arts films
American martial arts films
2000s American films